Aiguille de Péclet (3,561 m) is a mountain of Savoie, France. It lies in the Massif de la Vanoise in the Graian Alps east of the resort of Val Thorens, on the edge of the Vanoise National Park.

References

Alpine three-thousanders
Mountains of the Graian Alps
Mountains of Savoie